Phantom Power is the sixth studio album by the Canadian rock band The Tragically Hip. The album was released in 1998. It won the 1999 Juno Awards for Best Rock Album and Best Album Design.

Songs
The album's first single, "Poets", reached #1 on RPM's alternative chart, and stayed #1 for 12 weeks straight, longer than any other song in the history of that chart.

"Bobcaygeon" was also released as a single, and won the Juno Award for Single of the Year in 2000. It has since become recognized as one of the band's most enduring and beloved signature songs.

The song "Escape Is at Hand for the Travellin' Man" is a tribute to Jim Ellison of Material Issue. The band recorded the song "Something On" while stuck in the studio during the ice storm of 1998.

Commercial performance
Phantom Power debuted at No. 1 on the Canadian Albums Chart with 108,000 units sold. The album has been certified triple platinum in Canada. By February 1999, the album had sold more than 400,000 copies in Canada. Between 1996 and 2016, Phantom Power was the seventh best-selling album by a Canadian band in Canada.

Track listing
All songs were written by The Tragically Hip.

The Tragically Hip
Gord Downie – lead vocals
Rob Baker – lead guitar
Paul Langlois – rhythm guitar
Gord Sinclair – bass guitar, backing vocals
Johnny Fay – drums

Year-end charts

References

1998 albums
The Tragically Hip albums
Universal Records albums
Juno Award for Rock Album of the Year albums